"Jupiter" is the sixth single released by the Japanese rock band Buck Tick, released on October 30, 1991. It is labeled with Victor Entertainment. It appeared 9 times in the Oricon Chart during 1991.

Track listing

Musicians
Atsushi Sakurai - Voice
Hisashi Imai - Guitar
Hidehiko Hoshino - Guitar
Yutaka Higuchi - Bass
Toll Yagami - Drums

References

External links
 

1991 singles
Buck-Tick songs
1991 songs
Victor Entertainment singles
Songs with lyrics by Atsushi Sakurai